Tatyana Lolova (10 February 1934 – 22 March 2021) was a Bulgarian stage and film actress. She was best known for her comedy roles that she played for more than 40 years, bringing her the reputation as one of the most popular Bulgarian actresses.

Biography and career
Lolova was born on 10 February 1934, in the Bulgarian capital city of Sofia. Her mother was of Russian-Ukrainian descent. Her father Zhelyazko Lolov was an accountant. Tatyana enrolled in the National Academy for Theatre and Film Arts where she graduated in 1955. After the graduation, she was appointed in Russe Theatre, where Lolova remained until the end of 1956 when she joined the troupe of the newly founded Satirical Theatre "Aleko Konstantinov“ in Sofia.

She died in Sofia from complications following a COVID-19 infection contracted on 6 March during the COVID-19 pandemic in Bulgaria. She was 87 and was cremated.

Partial filmography

References

Sources

External links
 

1934 births
2021 deaths
Bulgarian film actresses
Bulgarian stage actresses
Bulgarian television actresses
Actresses from Sofia
Deaths from the COVID-19 pandemic in Bulgaria
20th-century Bulgarian actresses
21st-century Bulgarian actresses
Bulgarian people of Russian descent
Bulgarian people of Ukrainian descent